Ouigo España is an open-access operator, that operates high-speed services between Madrid and Barcelona in Spain. It is a subsidiary of SNCF, the French national railway company, and uses its trademark Ouigo.

History 
The company was founded on December 13, 2018, under the name of Rielsfera S.A., and on September 28, 2020, it changed its name to Ouigo España S.A., in line with the Ouigo brand, previously introduced in France for low-cost services. Before using the Ouigo brand, Rielsfera considered using the Falbalá brand.

After the process initiated by Adif anticipating the liberalization of passenger rail transport, in November 2020 it signed the framework agreement that grants it capacity in the main high-speed corridors.

As part of the liberalization of rail passenger transport in Spain, the SNCF has also been offering Ouigo services there since May 2021. Initially, five pairs of Ouigo trains will connect Barcelona with Madrid, and connections from Madrid to Valencia, Alicante, Malaga and Seville are also planned for a later date. 14 TGV Duplex sets are used. Ouigo is in competition with the national railway Renfe's low-price brand Avlo, which began service in June 2021, and Iryo (owned by Air Nostrum and Trenitalia) which started in 2022.

Services

Routes 
As of March 2022, Ouigo España operates a single route between Madrid Atocha, Zaragoza–Delicias, Tarragona, and Barcelona Sants.

Rolling stock 
9 TGV Euroduplex trainsets are used for the service. Unlike those used by Ouigo in France, these trainsets still have the conventional SNCF TGV inOui interior.

See also 
 Avlo, a competitor service by Renfe
 Iryo, a competitor service by Air Nostrum and Trenitalia
 Ouigo, a sister company offering low-cost services in France

References

External links 

 Ouigo España

SNCF companies and subsidiaries
Railway companies of Spain
Low-cost high-speed rail services